The hilum overlay sign is an imaging appearance on chest radiographs in which the outline of the hilum can be seen at the level of a mass or collection in the mid chest.

See also
 Chest radiograph
 Human lung
 Mediastinum
 Radiology
 X-ray

References

Radiologic signs